The following radio stations broadcast on FM frequency 96.9 MHz:

Argentina
 9 digital in Concepción del Uruguay, Entre Ríos
 Bar in Alta Gracia, Córdoba
 Bien Argentina in Luján, Buenos Aires
 blu in Rio Cuarto, Córdoba
 LRM722 Dinámica in Esperanza, Santa Fe
 Estación del centro in Casilda, Santa Fe
 Junin.net in Junín, Buenos Aires
 La 97 Radio Fueguina in Rio Grande, Tierra del Fuego
 La Deportiva in Rosario, Santa Fe
 LU17 in Trelew, Chubut
 LRP740 Nativa in Reconquista, Santa Fe
 Punta del Sauce in La Carlota, Córdoba
 Radio María in Villa Ramallo, Buenos Aires
 Radio María in Laboulaye, Córdoba
 Sauron in Pehuajó, Buenos Aires
 Satelital in La Banda, Santiago del Estero
 Tropical in Formosa
 Universal Monte Hermoso in Monte Hermoso, Buenos Aires

Australia
 2KY in Cooma, New South Wales
 2SYD in Sydney, New South Wales
 ABC Western Victoria in Portland, Victoria
 3SUN in Shepparton, Victoria
 Radio National in Albany, Western Australia
 SBS Radio in Perth, Western Australia

Canada (Channel 245)
 CBK-FM in Regina, Saskatchewan
 CBKF-FM-5 in North Battleford, Saskatchewan
 CBON-FM-23 in Manitouwadge, Ontario
 CBSE-FM in Sept-Iles, Quebec
 CBUC-FM in Salmon Arm, British Columbia
 CBUF-FM-3 in Terrace, British Columbia
 CBXK-FM in Fox Lake, Alberta
 CFIX-FM in Chicoutimi, Quebec
 CHEF-FM-3 in Lebel-sur-Quevillon, Quebec
 CIAM-FM-13 in Peerless Lake, Alberta
 CIAM-FM-17 in Chateh, Alberta
 CICP-FM in Cranberry Portage, Manitoba
 CIFR-FM in Fairford, Manitoba
 CISI-FM in South Indian Lake, Manitoba
 CJAQ-FM in Calgary, Alberta
 CJAX-FM in Vancouver, British Columbia
 CJMD-FM in Levis, Quebec
 CJXL-FM in Moncton, New Brunswick
 CKHC-FM in Toronto, Ontario
 CKLG-FM-1 in Whistler, British Columbia
 CKOI-FM in Verdun, Quebec
 CKQX-FM in Pelican Rapids, Manitoba
 CKUA-FM-5 in Peace River, Alberta
 VF2106 in Lac Brochet, Manitoba
 VF2107 in Poplar River, Manitoba
 VF2108 in Red Sucker Lake, Manitoba
 VF2109 in Tadoule Lake, Manitoba
 VF2167 in Pukatawagan, Manitoba
 VF2168 in Wabowden, Manitoba
 VF2175 in Gods River, Manitoba
 VF2196 in Berens River, Manitoba
 VF2198 in Garden Hill, Manitoba
 VF2199 in Shamattawa, Manitoba
 VF2220 in Brochet, Manitoba
 VF2222 in Nelson House, Manitoba
 VF2261 in Cormorant, Manitoba
 VF2262 in Duck Bay, Manitoba
 VF2263 in Grand Rapids, Manitoba
 VF2264 in Pikwitonei, Manitoba
 VF2265 in Split Lake, Manitoba
 VF2312 in Churchill, Manitoba
 VF2313 in Moose Lake, Manitoba
 VF2314 in Oxford House, Manitoba
 VF2319 in Fording River Mine Site, British Columbia
 VF2338 in Thicket Portage, Manitoba
 VF2339 in Bloodvein, Manitoba
 VF2369 in Lillooet, British Columbia
 VF2407 in Little Grand Rapids, Manitoba
 VF2423 in Lynn Lake, Manitoba
 VF2503 in Fisher River, Manitoba

China 
 CNR The Voice of China in Baotou and Quanzhou

El Salvador
YSSS at San Salvador

Guatemala (Channel 23)
TGXA-FM in Guatemala City

Malaysia
 Sinar in Ipoh, Kuala Kangsar, Central Perak, South Perak, Hilir Perak, North Selangor, Negeri Sembilan and South Selangor

Mexico
 XEW-FM in Mexico City
 XHAP-FM in Ciudad Obregón, Sonora
 XHBUAP-FM in Puebla, Puebla
 XHCAP-FM in Zacapu, Michoacán
 XHCPH-FM in Hidalgo del Parral, Chihuahua
 XHHF-FM in Tampico, Tamaulipas
 XHKR-FM in Tuxtla Gutiérrez, Chiapas
 XHMUG-FM in Mexicali, Baja California
 XHNS-FM in Acapulco, Guerrero
 XHOAX-FM in Oaxaca, Oaxaca
 XHOD-FM in San Luis Potosí, San Luis Potosí
 XHPEDX-FM in Linares, Nuevo León
 XHPSEN-FM in Ensenada, Baja California
 XHSCCU-FM in Álvaro Obregon, Michoacan
 XHSIAV-FM in Chapulhuacán, Hidalgo
 XHTZ-FM in Xalapa, Veracruz
 XHUH-FM in San Juan Bautista Tuxtepec, Oaxaca
 XHUL-FM in Mérida, Yucatán
 XHVQ-FM in Culiacán, Sinaloa
 XHWU-FM in Matehuala, San Luis Potosí

Nigeria

 Cool FM 96.9 in Abuja
 Cool FM 96.9 in Lagos
 Cool FM 96.9 in Kano

Philippines
DXKS-FM in Cagayan De Oro City

Taiwan 
 Transfer CNR The Voice of China in Kinmen County

United Kingdom
  in the Manchester area
  in South London
  in Hull
  in Preston
  in Stafford
  in St. Neots
  in Peacehaven
  in Stonehaven
  in the New Forest

United States (Channel 245)
 KACB-LP in College Station, Texas
  in Steamboat Springs, Colorado
 KCCY-FM in Pueblo, Colorado
 KDAG in Farmington, New Mexico
  in Watertown, South Dakota
  in Lost Hills, California
 KEPT-LP in Hayward, California
  in Spokane, Washington
  in Plainville, Kansas
 KFMN in Lihue, Hawaii
 KGLH-LP in Spicer, Minnesota
 KGPC-LP in Oakland, California
 KHBL-LP in Hannibal, Missouri
  in Lenwood, California
  in Clarion, Iowa
 KKGL in Nampa, Idaho
  in Pittsburg, Kansas
  in Odessa, Texas
  in Grand Rapids, Minnesota
 KMRD-LP in Madrid, New Mexico
  in Jackson, Wyoming
  in Phoenix, Arizona
 KODX-LP in Seattle, Washington
 KPPC-LP in San Antonio, Texas
 KPTL-LP in Temecula, California
 KQBZ in Brownwood, Texas
 KQEA-LP in San Francisco Sunset, California
 KQEB-LP in San Francisco, California
 KQNS-LP in Haleiwa, Hawaii
 KQOB in Enid, Oklahoma
 KQPK-LP in McCook, Nebraska
 KQRB in Effingham, Kansas
  in Deer Lodge, Montana
  in Grants Pass, Oregon
 KSAP-LP in Port Arthur, Texas
 KSCN (FM) in Pittsburg, Texas
 KSEG (FM) in Sacramento, California
  in Nashville, Arkansas
  in Mountain View, Missouri
 KVMV in Mcallen, Texas
  in Monterey, California
 KWLR in Bigelow, Arkansas
 KWYU in Christine, Texas
 KXBJ in El Campo, Texas
  in Amarillo, Texas
 KXTJ-LP in San Antonio, Texas
 KYBU in Covelo, California
  in Fairbanks, Alaska
 KYYO in McCleary, Washington
  in Brookfield, Missouri
  in Seward, Nebraska
  in Alexandria, Louisiana
  in Naches, Washington
  in Presque Isle, Maine
 WBQT in Boston, Massachusetts
  in Lexington, Michigan
 WDDJ in Paducah, Kentucky
 WDJR in Hartford, Alabama
  in East Hampton, New York
 WFAJ in Nassawadox, Virginia
  in Atlantic City, New Jersey
 WFVS-FM in Reynolds, Georgia
  in Paris, Kentucky
  in Buffalo, New York
  in Bremen, Indiana
 WHYR-LP in Baton Rouge, Louisiana
  in Fort Myers, Florida
 WIWF in Charleston, South Carolina
  in Jacksonville, Florida
 WJLM-LP in Altoona, Wisconsin
 WJNU-LP in Cookeville, Tennessee
  in Tavernier, Florida
  in Statesville, North Carolina
  in Hardinsburg, Indiana
  in Lancaster, Pennsylvania
  in Grand Rapids, Michigan
  in Willard, Ohio
 WLXY-LP in Chelsea, Alabama
 WMKI-LP in Terre Haute, Indiana
  in Wauseon, Ohio
  in Manati, Puerto Rico
  in Utica, New York
 WPLW-FM in Goldsboro, North Carolina
 WPRF-LP in New Britain, Connecticut
  in Fitzgerald, Georgia
  in Arlington, New York
 WRRK in Braddock, Pennsylvania
 WRRQ-LP in Cocoa, Florida
  in Holly Pond, Alabama
  in Mount Jackson, Virginia
 WSJB-LP in St. Joseph, Michigan
 WSMP-LP in Magee, Mississippi
  in Indianola, Mississippi
  in Wrens, Georgia
 WTJC-LP in Charlotte Amalie, Virgin Islands
 WUCH in Monterey, Tennessee
 WUHS-LP in West Union, Ohio
 WULD-LP in Waterloo, Wisconsin
 WVBC-LP in Bessemer, Alabama
  in Williamstown, West Virginia
 WWCM in Standish, Michigan
  in Zion, Illinois
 WWSA-LP in St. Albans, West Virginia
 WWTJ-LP in Watertown, New York
  in Bowling Green, Virginia
 WWWO-LP in Miami, Florida
  in Oshkosh, Wisconsin
  in Bristol, Virginia
 WXLP in Moline, Illinois
 WYDA in Troy, Ohio
 WYIR-LP in Baugh City, Indiana
 WZBF (FM) in Ridgebury, Pennsylvania

Vietnam
 Long An radio, Long An province

References

Lists of radio stations by frequency